Kamensk-Shakhtinsky is a town in Rostov Oblast, located on the Seversky Donets River. Population:

History
It was founded by Cossack settlers in 1686 and was granted town status in 1927.

Administrative and municipal status
Within the framework of administrative divisions, it is incorporated as Kamensk-Shakhtinsky Urban Okrug—an administrative unit with the status equal to that of the districts. As a municipal division, this administrative unit also has urban okrug status.

Economy
Once a major coal-mining center of the eastern Donets coal basin, it now an important producer of artificial fibers and mining machinery as well as glass. European route E40 passes through Kamensk-Shakhtinsky. The Kamensky chemical plant is located at the city.

Gallery

See also
Monument to railwaymen

References

Notes

Sources

External links

Official website of Kamensk-Shakhtinsky 
Kamensk-Shakhtinsky Business Directory 

Cities and towns in Rostov Oblast
Don Host Oblast